John Blair Linn (March 14, 1777August 30, 1804) was an American clergyman and poet.

John Blair Linn was born in Shippensburg, Pennsylvania, on March 14, 1777. William Linn, his father, was an academic administrator.

Linn graduated from Columbia College in 1793. He published in magazines and newspapers while at college.

After college, Linn studied law in the office of Alexander Hamilton, a friend of his father's, but did not take to it. After abandoning the law, he studied theology with Dirck Romeyn at Union College, receiving an MA in 1797.  He was ordained a Presbyterian clergyman in 1798 and became assistant pastor of the First Presbyterian Church in Philadelphia on June 13, 1799.

Shortly after his graduation from college, Linn wrote a play titled Bourville Castle, or the Gallic Maidens. The play premiered at John Street Theatre on January 16, 1797, but was not successful. He published five books of poetry and three prose works.

He died of tuberculosis in Philadelphia on August 30, 1804.

References

Sources

Further reading 
 

1777 births
1804 deaths
18th-century American poets
18th-century American clergy
Columbia College (New York) alumni
People from Shippensburg, Pennsylvania
Union College (New York) alumni